Domino Kid is a 1957 American Western film directed by Ray Nazarro and written by Kenneth Gamet and Hal Biller. The film stars Rory Calhoun, Kristine Miller, Andrew Duggan, Yvette Dugay, Peter Whitney and Eugene Iglesias. The film was released in October 1957, by Columbia Pictures.

Plot
Domino (Rory Calhoun) returns from the Civil War to find his ranch in ruins and his father murdered. Five men were responsible and four were identified. One by one Domino outdraws the four that were known, all being outlaws. There is only one left now. Domino does not know his identity but that man probably knows of Domino and his mission.

Cast          
Rory Calhoun as Domino
Kristine Miller as Barbara Ellison
Andrew Duggan as Wade Harrington
Yvette Dugay as Rosita
Peter Whitney as Lafe Prentiss
Eugene Iglesias as Juan Cortez
Robert Burton as Sheriff Travers 
Tom London as Davis - Rancher (uncredited)

References

External links
 

1957 films
1950s English-language films
American Western (genre) films
1957 Western (genre) films
Columbia Pictures films
Films directed by Ray Nazarro
1950s American films